Edius is a video editing software package for PC computers running Windows.

Edius is a non-linear editor (NLE) that works with most modern video formats. The software is capable of 3D editing.  The software comes bundled with a large collection of tools, including NEWBlue Video Filters, proDAD video effects along with image stabilization for unsteady shots and for audio mastering needs iZotope VST audio plug-ins such as Audio Effects Suite, AudioRestore, AGC & Mastering Effects Suite.

Edius was originally developed by the Japanese-based Canopus Corporation and first introduced for Windows XP in 2003. In 2005, the Canopus Corporation was sold to Grass Valley. The first version released by Grass Valley was Edius 4.0. Edius 5.5 (released around 2010) was the first version to support Windows Vista and Windows 7. The first version to support Windows 8 (and the first that was later discovered to also run on Windows 10) was Edius 6.5 (released June 2012). The current version (as of 2020) is Edius X.

Release history

References 

EDIUS
2003 software